Di-tert-butoxyacetylene is the organic compound with the formula (CH3)3COC≡COC(CH3)3.  A pale yellow liquid, it is one of the more common dialkoxyacetylenes.  Most other dialkoxyacetylenes are very labile.  For example, dimethoxyacetylene polymerizes within seconds at 0 °C.  Di-tert-butoxyacetylene can be prepared from 1,4-dioxane in a multistep procedure.

References

Tert-butyl compounds
Alkyne derivatives